Yacha is a town of Baisha Li Autonomous County, Hainan, China. , it has 5 residential communities and 13 villages under its administration.

References

Township-level divisions of Hainan
Baisha Li Autonomous County
County seats in Hainan